Verne Global is a UK-headquartered company that provides data center solutions for enterprise and hyperscalers. It  provides colocation and cloud services to a variety of enterprises and hyperscalers across financial services, earth sciences, life sciences, engineering, scientific research and AI including BMW, Volkswagen, Earlham Institute, DeepL, Peptone, Threatmetrix, Datto

Verne Global operates a 40-acre data center campus near Keflavik in Iceland commissioned in 2012. The company provides an environment for high performance computing (HPC), supercomputing and other high intensity computing workloads, as well as complete life-cycle support. The Iceland datacenter is powered with 100% renewable energy.

Location 
Verne Global is located on the site of the former Naval Air Station Keflavik, which more recently served as a NATO airbase. Iceland was regarded as the lowest risk data center location globally by Cushman and Wakefield in 2016.

Iceland is connected via different subsea cables to North America (via Greenland Connect), Europe (via DANICE) and the UK (via FARICE). A further connection called IRIS will connect Iceland to the technology hub of Dublin, Ireland, expected to be completed in 2022.

Sustainability 
Iceland's power grid is fuelled by 100% renewable energy in the form of hydro-electric and geothermal power. Verne Global capitalises on Iceland's natural supply of renewable energy to fuel its energy-intensive operations, and mitigate the environmental effects of running artificial intelligence and machine learning workloads.

Iceland's temperate climate also means the data center campus utilises free air cooling to keep its hardware cool all year round.

Funding 
The company is owned by Digital 9 Infrastructure plc since September 2021 who bought it from a consortium including Novator Partners, General Catalyst Partners, The Wellcome Trust and Iceland-based Stefnir.

Technology Partners 
 Dell Technologies Inc.

Verne Global is a Dell Technologies Platinum Partner.

 NVIDIA Corporation

Verne Global is an NVIDIA Preferred Partner and its data center campus is certified as NVIDIA DGX-Ready.

Compliance 
The company is ISO 27001 certified, PCI compliant and HIPAA compliant.

References 

[Cushman & Wakefield Data Center Risk Index 2016

Companies based in Virginia
Keflavík